Samuel A. Irvin was the Collector of Internal Revenue for the 1st District of Illinois and served for several years as City Counsellor of the City of Chicago. During the term of Hermann Raster as Collector of Internal Revenue he served as his chief deputy. When Raster resigned due to political matters in late May 1872, President Ulysses S. Grant elected Irvin as his replacement on April 8.

References

Illinois Republicans
1833 births
1918 deaths